Marlene Cowling (born 26 August 1941 in Dauphin, Manitoba) was a member of the House of Commons of Canada from 1993 to 1997 in the Dauphin—Swan River electoral district. By career, she is a farmer.

Cowling was elected as a Liberal Member of Parliament in the 1993 federal election. She was defeated by Inky Mark of the Reform Party in the 1997 election.

Electoral record

|-

|-

|align="left" colspan=2|Liberal gain from Progressive Conservative
|align="right"|Swing
|align="right"| -18.85
|align="right"|

References
 

1941 births
Women members of the House of Commons of Canada
Living people
Liberal Party of Canada MPs
Members of the House of Commons of Canada from Manitoba
People from Dauphin, Manitoba
Women in Manitoba politics